Rouge was an English-language action/adventure television series from Singapore that ran on both Channel 5 and throughout Southeast Asia on MTV Asia in 2004 (both companies also co-produced the program). The show also ran in Australia (on MTV Australia) and the United States (on AZN Television).

The 13-part series follows a Southeast Asian all-girl rock band who are also high-tech special operatives working for a global crime-fighting organization (titled "The Organization"), as they take on a counter-espionage network known as "The Brotherhood."

Cast
 Denise Laurel – Pat
 Mariel Rodriguez – Pam
 Desiree Ann Siahaan – Ling
 Ngo Thanh Van – Thủy
 Pierre Png – Hong
 Pamela Fields – Jazz
 Dao Ming Hso – Zeng

External links
 
 Megamedia, Rouge's production company
 

Singaporean crime television series
Espionage television series
MTV original programming
AZN Television original programming
2000s American television series
2004 Singaporean television series debuts
2004 Singaporean television series endings
Channel 5 (Singapore) original programming